Mohammad Abdul-Wali, (1940–1973) was a Yemeni diplomat and a prominent Yemeni writer of Ethiopian descent, and one of the earliest authors in Yemen to adopt writing for artistic purposes rather than for nationalist agendas.

Life 
Abdul-Wali was born in Ethiopia. His mother was Ethiopian and his father had emigrated from northern Yemen. In 1955, Abdul-Wali began his studies at the university of Cairo, where he got interested in Marxism. He was expelled from Egypt, and after a brief period in Yemen he moved to Moscow, where he learnt Russian and studied literature at the Gorky Institute.

After finishing his studies in 1962, he returned to North Yemen, which just had won its independence. He was enrolled in the young country's diplomatic corps and became chargé d'affaires first in Moscow and later in Berlin. He also had a brief spell as head of Yemen Airlines, but fell out of favour with the government and was imprisoned. He died in a never thoroughly investigated airplane crash on his way from Aden to Hadramaut in South Yemen along with a group of other ambassadors.

Works 
Abdul-Wali is considered one of the forerunners of the modern Yemenite literary movement. He published three collections of short stories: al-Ard, ya Salma ("Our land, Salma", 1966), Shay’ ismuhu al-hanin ("Something called love", 1972) and ’Ammuna Salih ("Uncle Salih", 1978), as well as two novellas: Yamutun ghuraba’ ("They Die Strangers") and San’a’ ... madina maftuha ("San’a – open city"). His collected works were posthumously published in 1987. The English-language collection They Die Strangers. A Novella and Stories from Yemen was published in 2001.

Given his Ethiopian heritage, many of his works dealt with Yemeni immigrants and exiles and the fate of Yemeni-African marriages. His novella They Die Strangers, for example, is about a Yemeni national who opens a small shop in Addis Ababa but long has a desire to return home.

References

Footnotes 

Yemeni writers
Yemeni diplomats
1940 births
1973 deaths
Ethiopian emigrants to Yemen
Yemeni expatriates in Egypt
Yemeni expatriates in the Soviet Union
Yemeni expatriates in Germany
Maxim Gorky Literature Institute alumni